Shahrak-e Eslamabad (also Romanized as Shahrak-e Eslāmābād) is a village in Negur Rural District, Dashtiari District, Chabahar County, Sistan and Baluchestan Province, Iran. At the 2006 census, its population was 185, in 26 families.

References 

Populated places in Chabahar County